was a Japanese music television show which aired weekly from April 3, 2004 to September 19, 2014 on the Fuji TV television network.

References

Japanese music television series
Fuji TV original programming
2004 Japanese television series debuts
2014 Japanese television series endings
2000s Japanese television series
2010s Japanese television series